Ribautia rainbowi is a species of centipede in the Geophilidae family. It is endemic to Australia, and was first described in 1912 by French myriapodologist Henry Wilfred Brolemann.

Description
The original description of this species is based on a single female specimen measuring about 50 mm in length with 65 pairs of legs.

Distribution
The species occurs in New South Wales.

Behaviour
The centipedes are solitary terrestrial predators that inhabit plant litter, soil and rotting wood.

References

 

 
rainbowi
Centipedes of Australia
Endemic fauna of Australia
Fauna of New South Wales
Animals described in 1912
Taxa named by Henry Wilfred Brolemann